The 2004 Paris Motor Show (Mondial de l'Automobile) took place from 25 September to 10 October 2004 in Paris expo Porte de Versailles. There was an extra exhibition called L'Automobile et la bande Dessinée ("The Car and the Stripbook") in Palace 8.

Introductions
 Alfa Romeo 147
 Aston Martin Vanquish S
 Audi A3 Sportback
 Audi A4
 BMW 1 Series
 BMW M5
 Chevrolet Kalos (three door)
 Chevrolet M3X
 Chevrolet S3X
 Chrysler 300C Touring
 Citroën C4
 Citroën C5 (facelift)
 Ferrari F430
 Fiat Panda 4x4 Climbing
 Fiat Stilo Uproad
 Ford Focus (three and five door hatchbacks, station wagon)
 Honda CR-V (diesel)
 Honda Jazz
 Hyundai Coupe
 Hyundai Sonata
 Kia Sportage
 Lancia Musa
 Maserati MC12
 Mazda 5
 Mercedes-Benz A-Class (W169)
 Mercedes-Benz CLS-Class (W219)
 MG TF (France Only)
 Mitsubishi Colt CZ3/CZT
 Mitsubishi Outlander (turbo)
 Opel Astra GTC
 Peugeot 1007
 Peugeot 607 (facelift)
 Peugeot 907
 Porsche 911 Carrera
 Porsche Boxster
 Renault Fluence Concept
 Renault Wind Concept
 Rover 75 ("100th anniversary")
 Seat Toledo
 Skoda Fabia (Typ6Y facelift)
 Škoda Octavia Wagon
 Smart Forfour Sportstyle
 Suzuki Swift
 Toyota Land Cruiser
 Volkswagen Golf GTI
 Volvo XC90 V8

References

Auto shows in France
Paris Motor Show
Paris Motor Show
Motor Show
Events in Paris
Paris Motor Show